Niccolò Billy (also called Nicolò Billy I) was an Italian engraver of the 18th century, active in Rome. Originally from France, he was active around 1734 along with his brother Antonio Billy. They engraved several portraits and historical subjects. Niccoló engraved some plates for the 12 volumes of the Museum Florentinum, including self-portraits of Federico Zuccari; Hans Holbein; Pier Leone Ghezzi; and Giovanni Morandi.

He also engraved Cardinal Pompeo Aldrovandi after G. Berti; Infant Jesus sleeping;  Cardinal Spinelli;  St. Philip Neri kneeling before the Virgin after Sebastiano Conca; The Holy Family: after Annibale Carracci; St Michael the Archangel after Pietro da Cortona (1689); and The Flight into Egypt; after Guido Reni. 
 
He engraved images of Louis XIV based on designs of Ludovico Gimignani and Michelangelo Causeo based on designs of Carlo Maratta (1690). He engraved Celebriores Vallumbrosanae Congregationis Sancti, Beati ac Venerabilis (1695) for Giovanni Aurelio Casari, and from 1734 to 1747, the cardinals based on the chalcography of Giovanni Giacomo de Rossi.

References

 Museo di Roma

Italian engravers
Italian Baroque painters